Ramon Solsona i Sancho (Barcelona, February 7, 1950) is a Catalan writer and publicist. He has a degree in Romance Philology and he is also a high school teacher on leave. Notable for his ironic style and numerous collaborations with print media (Avui, Diari de Barcelona, La Vanguardia) and radio (Catalunya Ràdio, RAC 1), he is a currently collaborator of a radio program (El Matí de Catalunya Ràdio with Mònica Terribas, section "Entre paraules").

Career
He has also been a poet (satirist) under the pseudonym Lo Gaiter del Besòs. His novel Les hores detingudes won three literary prizes in the same year and was translated into Spanish and French. For television, he has worked as a writer for the series Agència de viatges, Estació d'enllaç and El cor de la ciutat, which were broadcast by TV3. He was author of the lyrics of the hymn for the centenary of FC Barcelona (1998), set to music by Antoni Ros-Marbà. In 2010 he received the premi Sant Jordi de novel·la for his book L'home de la maleta.

Works

Short stories 
 1991: Llibreta de vacances
 2006: Cementiri de butxaca

Novels
 1989: Figures de calidoscopi
 1993: Les hores detingudes
 1998: DG
 1999: No tornarem mai més
 2001: El cor de la ciutat
 2004: Línia blava
 2011: L'home de la maleta

Poetry 
 1989: Sac de gemecs

Nonfiction 
 1995: Ull de bou
 1995 Ull de vaca
 2005: A paraules em convides

Notes

External links 
Ramon Solsona at the website of Associació d'Escriptors en Llengua Catalana (AELC).

Living people
Public relations people
Poets from Catalonia
Novelists from Catalonia
Short story writers from Catalonia
21st-century Spanish writers
Spanish television writers
Spanish male poets
Spanish male novelists
Spanish male short story writers
20th-century Spanish novelists
21st-century novelists
20th-century Spanish poets
20th-century Spanish male writers
Male television writers
Spanish satirists
Writers from Barcelona
Articles containing video clips
1950 births
20th-century short story writers
21st-century short story writers
21st-century Spanish male writers
Catalan-language writers